The canton of Le Moyen Grésivaudan is an administrative division of the Isère department, eastern France. It was created at the French canton reorganisation which came into effect in March 2015. Its seat is in Crolles.

It consists of the following communes:
 
Bernin
La Combe-de-Lancey
Crolles
Laval-en-Belledonne
Lumbin
Plateau-des-Petites-Roches
Revel
Sainte-Agnès
Saint-Ismier
Saint-Jean-le-Vieux
Saint-Mury-Monteymond
Saint-Nazaire-les-Eymes
La Terrasse
Le Versoud
Villard-Bonnot

References

Cantons of Isère